The Sirobasidiaceae are a family of fungi in the order Tremellales. Taxa are widespread, primarily tropical, and typically grow on wood and bark.

References

Tremellomycetes